The Hron is a  long left tributary of the Danube and the second-longest river in Slovakia. It flows from its source in the Low Tatra Mountains (below Kráľova hoľa) through central and southern Slovakia, emptying into the Danube near Štúrovo and Esztergom. Major cities and towns on the Hron are Brezno, Banská Bystrica, Sliač, Zvolen, Žiar nad Hronom, Žarnovica, Nová Baňa, Tlmače, Levice, Želiezovce, and Štúrovo.

Hron is a popular destination of water tourism.

Etymology
The name is probably of Germanic origin; *Granahua: gran – spruce, ahua – water.

History
The name of the river was mentioned for the first time in 170, when Roman Emperor Marcus Aurelius wrote his Meditations at the Hron river. The first recorded medieval name was Gron (1075). From the 17th century until the 1930s, the river was used for wood transport.

References

Rivers of Slovakia
Tributaries of the Danube